Cheleh Gah or Chelleh Gah may refer to:
 Cheleh Gah, Chaharmahal and Bakhtiari